Berlinți is a commune in Briceni District, Moldova. It is composed of two villages, Berlinți and Caracușenii Noi.

History

On  the entire Jewish population of the town was murdered in a massacre by Nazi Germany. A small memorial for the massacre was built in 1952.

In October 2021 a drunk driver rammed his car into a man inside the village, killing him. The incident was reportedly intentional.

References

Communes of Briceni District
Holocaust locations in Moldova